Credit control is the system used by businesses and central banks to make sure that credit is given only to borrowers who are likely to be able to repay it. As such matters are rarely certain, credit controllers control lending by calculating and managing risk.

Overview
Credit control is part of the financial controls that are employed by businesses particularly in manufacturing to ensure that once sales are made they are realised as cash or liquid resources.

Credit control is a critical system of control that prevents the business from becoming illiquid due to improper and un-coordinated issuance of credit to customers.  Credit control has a number of sections that include - credit approval, credit limit approval, dispatch approvals as well as collection process.

In a large business a credit process will be run by a senior manager and will include processes as such as Know Your Customer (KYC), account opening, approval of credit and credit limits (both in terms of the amounts and the terms e.g. 30 Days, 30 Days net), extension of credit and effecting collection action.

Credit control will normally report to the Finance Director or Risk Management Committee.

Procedures for issuing credit
During the selling process a potential customer or even a current customer who pays cash may request for credit lines to be extended.  At this point the following process may be followed:-

1. Formal letter of application for credit to be extended to a customer entity

2. Head of Finance evaluates the credit requested

3. Risk managers evaluate if the credit fits in with the current risk portfolio

4. Credit Collection period (usually in Days) is considered both as a stand-alone and as a component of the working capital cycle in particular ensuring that it does not exceed the Payables Period (usually in Days too).

5. External rating agencies may be invoked to assess the risk attached to extending credit to the customer.  Usually credit worthiness of a firm may be assessed independently by firms such as Dun & Bradstreet, Bloomberg, AC Nielsen or other reputable firms.

6. Fillers are also made into the market to assess the credit worthiness of a firm

7. An internal evaluation is made considering the risk of Bad or Doubtful Debts against the profit or returns.

8. After Risk Manager and Finance Director is satisfied that the extension of credit will not result in loss of principal.  Credit is extended.

9. An account is opened with the credit setting set for the agreed terms: Cap of credit the customer will enjoy and the terms or duration which they will enjoy that credit.  In other words, the time-limit as well as the value of the credit are sides of the same coin.

Non-collectibility of extended credit

Extended credit could, despite all efforts made, become noncollectable.  In this case a professional Debt collection agency may be hired along with attendant legal, court and other fees.  This event is normally dreaded and most Chartered Accountants are reluctant to consider that credit extended has now become noncollectable necessitating a debt write off if the receivable has gone bust or a provision if only a lower amount can ultimately be collected.

Risk of credit

Unwarranted debt may be a serious strain on the company and could lead to company failure.  Many SMEs have failed due to unsatisfactory Debt Collection processes or procedures.  During the credit crunch many businesses experienced a serious credit risk and severely curtailed extension of credit to partner firms and businesses.  Even though the current situation is much less severe credit extension remains a key, pivotal role in business management.

Credit